Third Ear Recitation is an album by American jazz saxophonist David S. Ware recorded in 1992 and released on the Japanese DIW label. This is the first recording by the David S. Ware Quartet with Whit Dickey replacing former drummer Marc Edwards.

Music
Ware, who learned circular breathing from Sonny Rollins at the age of sixteen, tackles the Rollins composition "East Broadway Run Down" at almost twice the tempo Rollins did on the album of the same name in 1966. Ware, a lifelong student of rhythm, dedicated "The Chase" to early associate drummer Beaver Harris, who died in December 1991. The quartet also plays two standards, Matt Dennis' "Angel Eyes", and two completely different takes of Joseph Kosma's "Autumn Leaves".

Reception

In his review for AllMusic, Thom Jurek states: "This is one of David S. Ware's most notorious, yet well-developed and executed recordings."
The Penguin Guide to Jazz wrote that the album "was some sort of confirmation of Ware's growing interest in a more linear and at the same time harmonically refined approach to jazz."

Track listing
All compositions by David S. Ware except as indicated
 "Autumn Leaves" (Joseph Kosma) - 3:43 
 "East Broadway Run Down" (Sonny Rollins) - 9:40 
 "Mystic March" - 5:39 
 "Angel Eyes" (Matt Dennis) - 7:18 
 "Third Ear Recitation" - 4:42
 "Free Flow Dialogue" - 3:17 
 "Sentient Compassion" - 6:46
 "The Chase" - 9:11 
 "Autumn Leaves" (Joseph Kosma) - 8:56

Personnel
David S. Ware - tenor sax
Matthew Shipp - piano
William Parker - bass
Whit Dickey - drums

References

1993 albums
David S. Ware albums
DIW Records albums